James Dargaville (born 25 April 1992) is an Australian rugby union footballer who currently plays as a wing for the New South Wales Country Eagles in the National Rugby Championship, following stints with the Brumbies and North Harbour. He also represented the Sydney Stars in the inaugural National Rugby Championship. He has occasionally played as a centre as well.

Career

Dargaville started out his rugby career playing colts level rugby for Warringah and later Sydney University. He progressed to the Sydney Uni Shute Shield team in 2013 and was an instant hit scoring 24 tries in his first 2 seasons. This devastating form alerted the newly formed Sydney Stars who signed him up for the first ever National Rugby Championship season in 2014 where he scored 3 tries in 8 appearances.

International career

Dargaville was a member of the Australia Under-20 side which competed in the 2012 IRB Junior World Championship in South Africa.

Super Rugby statistics

References

1992 births
Living people
Australian rugby union players
Rugby union wings
Rugby union players from Queensland
Sydney Stars players
ACT Brumbies players
People educated at Mater Maria Catholic College
Canberra Vikings players
Sunwolves players
North Harbour rugby union players
Shizuoka Blue Revs players
Rugby union centres
Rugby union fullbacks